15th Regiment or 15th Infantry Regiment may refer to:

 15th Field Regiment, Royal Canadian Artillery
 15th Infantry Regiment (Philippine Commonwealth Army)
 15th Infantry Regiment (South Korea)
 East Yorkshire Regiment (15th Regiment of Foot, United Kingdom)
 15th Infantry Regiment (United States)
 15th Infantry Regiment (USAFIP-NL)
15th New York Regiment
 15th Poznań Uhlan Regiment (Poland)

 American Revolutionary War regiments 
 15th Continental Regiment
 15th Massachusetts Regiment
 15th Virginia Regiment

 American Civil War regiments 

 Confederate (Southern) Army regiments
 15th South Carolina Infantry Regiment
 15th Regiment Alabama Infantry

 Union (Northern) Army regiments
 15th Connecticut Infantry Regiment
 15th Illinois Volunteer Infantry Regiment
 15th Regiment Illinois Volunteer Cavalry
 15th Iowa Volunteer Infantry Regiment
 15th Regiment Massachusetts Volunteer Infantry
 15th West Virginia Volunteer Infantry Regiment
 15th Wisconsin Volunteer Regiment

See also
XV Corps (disambiguation)
15th Army (disambiguation)
15th Division (disambiguation)
15th Group (disambiguation)
15th Wing (disambiguation)
15th Brigade (disambiguation)
15 Squadron (disambiguation)